Events in the year 1957 in Portugal.

Incumbents
President: Francisco Craveiro Lopes
Prime Minister: António de Oliveira Salazar

Events
4 November – Portuguese legislative election, 1957.

Arts and entertainment

Sports
SC Melgacense founded

Births

6 September – José Sócrates, prime minister

Deaths
24 December – Domingos Oliveira, politician, military officer (born 1873)

References

 
1950s in Portugal
Portugal
Years of the 20th century in Portugal
Portugal